Birmingham is a city in Oakland County in the U.S. state of Michigan.  It is a northern suburb of Detroit located along the Woodward Corridor (M-1).  As of the 2010 census, the population was 20,103.

History
The area comprising what is now the city of Birmingham was part of land ceded by Native American tribes to the United States government by the 1807 Treaty of Detroit. However, settlement was delayed, first by the War of 1812. Afterward the Surveyor-General of the United States, Edward Tiffin, made an unfavorable report regarding the placement of Military Bounty Lands for veterans of the War of 1812. Tiffin's report claimed that, because of marsh, in this area "There would not be an acre out of a hundred, if there would be one out of a thousand that would, in any case, admit cultivation." In 1818, Territorial Governor Lewis Cass led a group of men along the Indian Trail. The governor's party discovered that the swamp was not as extensive as Tiffin had supposed. Not long after Cass issued a more encouraging report about the land, interest quickened as to its suitability for settlement.

The earliest land entry was made on January 28, 1819, by Colonel Benjamin Kendrick Pierce (brother of future U.S. President Franklin Pierce) for the northwest quarter of section 36. Colonel Pierce visited his land several times, but never settled on it.  In March 1818, John W. Hunter and his brother Daniel left Auburn, New York, by sleigh and traveled to Michigan by way of Upper Canada. They waited in Detroit for their father and other family members, who arrived by schooner via Lake Erie in July. The family remained in Detroit until spring 1819, when Hunter made an entry for the northeast quarter of section 36, now in the southeast section of current-day Birmingham. Lacking a proper land survey, Hunter mistakenly built his log house on a tract later purchased by Elijah Willits. That house was later occupied by William Hall, a son-in-law of Elisha Hunter, while John W. Hunter built another log house a short distance to the southeast. On September 25, 1821, Elijah Willits made a land entry for the southwest quarter of section 25. Two days later, Major John Hamilton made an entry for the southeast quarter of section 25. Each of these initial land entries met at what is now the intersection of Maple Road and Pierce Street.

For a time, all three men, John W. Hunter, Hamilton, and Willits, operated hotels and taverns from their houses within a short distance from each other. While Hunter did not continue for very long, Hamilton and Willits continued a rivalry for many years, competing with each other for business from travelers on Woodward Avenue between Detroit and Pontiac. The growing settlement was known variously as "Hamilton's", "Hunter's", or "Willits'"; it was later known as "Piety Hill".

The settlement's original plat was surveyed and recorded on August 25, 1836, in the northwest quarter of section 36, then owned by Rosewell T. Merrill, who also ran the town foundry and the thrashing machine factory. Merrill named his plat "Birmingham" after Birmingham, England; he envisioned that it would also become a great industrial center. Elijah Willits recorded a plat on his property on December 20, 1837. John W. Hunter followed suit with two plats on his property on January 31, 1840, and June 21, 1842, while Major Hamilton laid out a plat on October 7, 1846. Several other properties were subsequently platted as additions. The plats made in 1836 and 1837 were in anticipation of completion of the Detroit and Pontiac Railroad.

Now known as 'Birmingham', the village first received mail through the "Bloomfield" post office. Birmingham established its own post office on April 5, 1838. The settlement incorporated as a village in 1864, comprising the northern half of section 36 and the southern half of section 25, with a total land area of one square mile. The first village elections were held March 1, 1864. It was soon governed by a seven-man board of trustees, who appointed a marshal and a treasurer. Birmingham re-incorporated as a city in 1933.  Prior to this, the area just north of 14 Mile along Woodward was known as "Eco City".

The names of the city's founders appear throughout Birmingham in civic institutions and commercial businesses:  Pierce Elementary School, Hunter House Hamburgers (which was located on the road formerly known as Hunter Boulevard, which bypassed downtown to the east and was renamed Woodward, with the original Woodward Avenue section renamed Old Woodward), Hamilton Hotel, Willits Building, and Merrill Street. Hall & Hunter Realtors adopted their name in honor of the builder and occupier of Birmingham's first home.

Geography

Birmingham is bordered by Bloomfield Hills on the northwest,  Royal Oak on the southeast, Bloomfield Charter Township on the west and north, Southfield Township on the south, and Troy on the northeast.

Demographics

2010 census
As of the census of 2010, there were 20,103 people, 9,039 households, and 5,307 families living in the city. The racial makeup of the city was 92.3% White, 3.0% African American, 0.1% Native American, 2.5% Asian, 0.4% from other races, and 1.6% from two or more races. Hispanic or Latino of any race were 2.1% of the population.

There were 9,039 households, of which 29.8% had children under the age of 18 living with them, 48.4% were married couples living together, 7.6% had a female householder with no husband present, 2.7% had a male householder with no wife present, and 41.3% were non-families. 36.2% of all households were made up of individuals, and 10.8% had someone living alone who was 65 years of age or older. The average household size was 2.22 and the average family size was 2.96.

The median age in the city was 41.1 years. 24.6% of residents were under the age of 18; 3.9% were between the ages of 18 and 24; 27.7% were from 25 to 44; 30.1% were from 45 to 64; and 13.7% were 65 years of age or older. The gender makeup of the city was 48.1% male and 51.9% female.

2000 census
As of the census of 2000, there were 19,291 people, 9,131 households, and 5,076 families living in the city. The racial makeup of the city was 96.13% White, 0.91% African American, 0.15% Native American, 1.50% Asian, 0.04% Pacific Islander, 0.19% from other races, and 1.09% from two or more races. Hispanic or Latino of any race were 1.19% of the population.

There were 9,131 households, out of which 24.7% had children under the age of 18 living with them, 47.6% were married couples living together, 6.1% had a female householder with no husband present, and 44.4% were non-families. 38.0% of all households were made up of individuals, and 10.1% had someone living alone who was 65 years of age or older.  The average household size was 2.11 and the average family size was 2.85.

In the city the population was spread out, with 21.2% under the age of 18, 3.9% from 18 to 24, 34.9% from 25 to 44, 26.0% from 45 to 64, and 14.0% who were 65 years of age or older.  The median age was 39 years. For every 100 females, there were 91.5 males.  For every 100 females age 18 and over, there were 88.2 males.

The median income for a household in the city was $80,861, and the median income for a family was $110,627. Males had a median income of $78,865 versus $51,834 for females. The per capita income for the city was $59,314.  About 1.6% of families and 2.9% of the population were below the poverty line, including 2.5% of those under age 18 and 3.3% of those age 65 or over.

Arts and culture

Settlers founded the First United Methodist Church in 1821 and conducted services in Elijah Willets' tavern. Its current structure was built in 1839; it is now the oldest church building in the city.  Other houses of worship represent many religions.

George H. Mitchell and Almeron Whitehead were two of a small group of bachelors who had formed a club called The Eccentrics; they published a newspaper of the same name, issuing the first edition on May 2, 1878. At a price of 2 cents, The Eccentric provided a "live home paper, replete with all the news of the day", with considerable emphasis on the "local items of importance occurring in Birmingham and immediate vicinity". By the turn of the 20th century, The Eccentric ran advertisements for Detroit stores and theaters, as well as offers of property and houses suitable for the "commuter". In the 1920s, the slogan of The Eccentric was "For a Bigger and Better Birmingham". Today, the Birmingham Eccentric newspaper continues its role as reporter of the community's local news.

In 1923, a group of friends formed The Village Players of Birmingham, a private theatre club. Originally, performances were given in the community house. In 1928 the group commissioned their own theater just outside the downtown area. Today this all-volunteer group is open to everyone and puts on five shows each year.

Birmingham's Community House, opened in 1923, is located in downtown Birmingham. It is a non-sectarian, non-partisan venue used for meetings, banquets, weddings and other celebrations.

In 2008, the Birmingham Little League won the nine- to ten-year-old Little League state championship. The team beat Western Little League 12–5 to earn the title.

Parks and recreation

The city has more than twenty parks, with many amenities, including tennis and pickleball courts, baseball diamonds, playgrounds, golf courses, sledding hills, nature trails, picnic areas, and deep woods. Shain Park, the city's main commons, is the site of the Village Fair, art shows, summer music concerts and numerous community events. At the center stands Freedom of the Human Spirit sculpted by Marshall Fredericks.

Education
The Birmingham City School District administers several nationally accredited schools, including Seaholm High School and Groves High School. Roeper School has a campus on Adams Road.

The Holy Name School is a co-educational parochial school founded by the Roman Catholic Holy Name Church. It educates children grades pre-K to 8. The private school was established in 1928, along with a convent for IHM nuns. (That has since closed.) The church and school continue to operate in conjunction today.

Pierce Elementary School in Birmingham provides classes for elementary school students of the French School of Detroit.

The Japanese School of Detroit (JSD), a supplementary school for Japanese citizens, first began holding classes in Birmingham in 1987, when its operation at Seaholm High started. It began holding classes at Covington School in 1989, and it also had classes at West Maple Elementary. At one point its school offices were in Birmingham. In 2010 the school announced it was moving its operations to Novi.

Public library

The Baldwin Public Library serves the city of Birmingham and nearby communities of Beverly Hills, Bingham Farms, and Bloomfield Hills. The original building first opened to the public on December 19, 1927. In October 1959, an extension for the Youth Department was added to the east side of the building. In 1983, another addition opened, changing the entrance to Merrill Street. There are over 120,000 books in the library, along with CDs, DVDs, periodicals, educational toys, databases and free Wi-Fi.

The library is named after Martha Baldwin, a civic leader and lifelong resident of Birmingham who was instrumental in establishing the first library. She also helped get improvements such as sidewalks laid for the business section, street lights, seats placed at interurban transit stops, flowers and trees planted, and trash baskets placed at the street corners.

Infrastructure

Transportation

Birmingham was a stagecoach stop in the 19th century between Detroit and Pontiac. 
In 1839, the railroad tracks were extended to Birmingham with two steam trains a day running to Detroit.

On June 18, 1896, the Oakland Railway, the electric interurban, was constructed to Birmingham; it provided service to Detroit in 40 minutes. This service ended in 1931 as many passengers switched to the commuter rail and automobiles.

Amtrak provides long-distance passenger rail service on the Pontiac–Detroit–Chicago Wolverine. It stops in Birmingham three times per day in each direction at the Birmingham, Michigan Amtrak station. Class one freight rail service is provided by Canadian National Railway (CN).

By 1931, the Grand Trunk Western Railroad (GTW) moved the railroad tracks to their present location. It provided commuter rail service from Pontiac to downtown Detroit with a stop in Birmingham. The Southeastern Michigan Transportation Authority (SEMTA) took control of this service in 1974 but it was ended on October 17, 1983, after subsidies were discontinued. Efforts continue to this day to restore such service.

In the 21st century, the Suburban Mobility Authority for Regional Transportation (SMART) and the Regional Transit Authority (RTA) operate local and regional bus transit.

Notable people

 Tim Allen, actor (raised in Birmingham)
 Shane Battier, basketball player for four NBA teams
 Mike Binder, film director, screenwriter and actor
 Randal Bryant, dean, Carnegie Mellon School of Computer Science
 Elaine Crosby, pro golfer
 Patricia Ellis, 1930s film actress, born in Birmingham
 Virgil Exner, automobile designer
 Marshall Fredericks, sculptor
 Wallace Frost, architect
 Pat Gillick, Baseball Hall of Famer 
 Clarence Dayton Hillman, businessman 
 Laura Innes, actress (attended Seaholm High School)
 Calvin Johnson, former NFL wide receiver
 Christine Lahti, Emmy-winning, Oscar-nominated actress
 Alexi Lalas, former pro soccer player
 Anita Lo, restaurateur
 Kurt Luedtke, journalist and Oscar award-winning screenwriter
 Michael J. Malik Sr., businessman
Alonzo L. McDonald business man and philanthropist
 Gerald S. McGowan, US ambassador to Portugal
 Ruth McNamee, Michigan state legislator and Mayor of Birmingham
 Steve Morrison, pro football linebacker
 Meg Oliver, anchor of CBS's Up to the Minute
 Mike Posner, singer
 Sam Raimi, film director (attended Groves High School)
 Andy Roeser, former president of NBA's Los Angeles Clippers
 Kurt Schottenheimer, former NFL assistant coach
 Alexandra Silber, actor and singer
 David Spade, actor and comedian
 Paul Stookey, member of the trio Peter, Paul, and Mary 
 Elaine Stritch, actress and vocalist
 Tom Tjaarda, automobile designer (attended Seaholm High School)
 Tom Tracy, pro football running back
 Dave Trott, US congressman
 Florence Signaigo Wagner (1919–2019), botanist who served as president of the American Fern Society
 Minoru Yamasaki, architect (office located in Birmingham) 
 Sheila Young, Olympic gold-winning speed skater and track cyclist

Further reading

See also

 Townsend Hotel
 Woodward Corridor

References

External links
City of Birmingham official website
Baldwin Public Library

Cities in Oakland County, Michigan
Metro Detroit
1819 establishments in Michigan Territory
Populated places established in 1819